Sharon Davis is the wife of US politician Gray Davis.

Shar(r)on or Sharen Davis or Davies may also refer to:

 Sharon Davis (composer), classical composer, publisher and widow of the composer William Schmidt
 Sharon Davis (figure skater), Canadian ice dancer
 Sharon K. Davis, American scientist
 Sharon Davis, the 1973 Miss Idaho beauty queen
Sharon Davies, a character on Neighbours
Sharron Davies, swimmer
Sharen Davis (born 1957), American costume designer